William Paull may refer to:
 William Paull (baritone) (c. 1872–1903), British baritone
 William Paull (politician) (1846–1926), member of the Queensland Legislative Assembly
 William of Pagula (died 1332), also known as William Paull, English canon lawyer and theologian